The following is a timeline of the history of Charlotte, North Carolina, United States.

Prior to 19th century

 1763 – Mecklenburg County established.
 1768 – Charlotte Town incorporated.
 1770 – Queen's Museum chartered.
 1774 – Charlotte becomes capital of county.
 1775 – Mecklenburg Resolves signed.
 1777 – Liberty Hall Academy incorporated.
 1780 – Battle of Charlotte fought.

19th century
 1835 – Charlotte Journal newspaper begins publication.
 1837 – Charlotte Mint opens.
 1850 – William F. Davidson becomes mayor.
 1852
 Railway begins operating.
 Western Democrat newspaper begins publication.
 1857
 Charlotte Female Institute established.
 YMCA becomes active.
 Gas lighting in use.
 1858 – Charlotte Military Academy established.
 1867 – Biddle Memorial Institute founded.
 1875 – Charlotte public schools established.
 1880 – Population: 7,084.
 1886 – Charlotte Chronicle newspaper begins publication.
 1887
 Electric lighting in use.
 Charlotte Fire Department founded.
 1888 – The Charlotte News begins publication.
 1890 – Charlotte Post newspaper begins publication.
 1891
 City hall built.
 Charlotte Literary and Library Association organized.
 1897 – Elizabeth College established.

20th century
 1903 – Charlotte Carnegie Public Library opens.
 1905
 Brevard Street Library for Negroes opens.
 Southern Power Company incorporated.
 1908 – Union National Bank founded.
 1915 – Temple Israel built.
 1921 – WBT radio begins broadcasting.
 1924
 Hotel Charlotte opens.
 Radiator Specialty Company founded.
 1930 – Population: 82,675.
 1932 – Charlotte Symphony Orchestra formed.
 1933 – WSOC radio begins broadcasting.
 1935 – Charlotte Municipal Airport established.
 1936 – Mint Museum opens.
 1940 – Population: 100,899.
 1946 – Charlotte Center of the University of North Carolina opens.
 1947 – The Unitarian Universalist Church of Charlotte founded.
 1949 – WBTV (television) begins broadcasting.
 1950 – Population: 134,042.
 1955 – Ovens Auditorium opens.
 1957
 WSOC-TV (television) begins broadcasting.
 American Commercial Bank formed.
 1960 – Population: 201,564.
 1961 – Stan Brookshire becomes mayor.
 1966 – Charlotte Botanical Gardens established.
 1967 – WCNC-TV begins broadcasting.
 1968 – Bartlett Tree Research Laboratories Arboretum established.
 1970
 SouthPark Mall opens.
 Population: 241,178.
 1971 – U.S. Supreme Court decides Swann v. Charlotte-Mecklenburg Board of Education, approving racial desegregation busing.
 1973 – Carowinds Monorail begins operating.
 1974 – Airplane accident.
 1976 – Afro-American Cultural Center established.
 1980 – Population: 314,447.
 1982 – Heroes Convention (comic books) begins.
 1983 – Harvey Gantt becomes mayor.
 1985 – Metrolina Theatre Association established.
 1986
 Opera Carolina formed.
 Airplane accident.
 1987 – WJZY begins broadcasting.
 1988
 Charlotte Hornets begins play.
 Charlotte Knights franchise established.
 1989 – Hurricane Hugo.
 1990 — Population: 395,934.
 1991
 Blockbuster Pavilion opens.
 Museum of the New South incorporated.
 1992
 North Carolina Blumenthal Performing Arts Center opens.
 Carolina Actors Studio Theatre and Carolinas Aviation Museum founded.
 1993
 City government computer network begins operating.
 Mel Watt becomes U.S. representative for North Carolina's 12th congressional district.
 1994
 WMYT-TV begins broadcasting.
 Airplane accident.
 Charlotte's Web Community Network online.
 1995
 Pat McCrory becomes mayor.
 Charlotte Convention Center and Tremont Music Hall open.
 City website online.
 Carolina Panthers began play as first NFL team in the Carolinas
 1997 – Loomis Fargo Bank Robbery.
 1998 – Bank of America formed.
 1999 – Federal court ends mandated racial integration in schools via busing.

21st century

2000s
 2000 – Population: 540,828.
 2002 – ConCarolinas begins.
 2003 – Airplane accident.
 2004
 Slow Food Charlotte founded.
 Street Soccer USA headquartered in city.
 2005 – Charlotte Bobcats Arena and ImaginOn open.
 2007
 Lynx Blue Line light rail begins operating.
 Billy Graham Library opens.
 2009 – Anthony Foxx becomes mayor.

2010s
 2010
 NASCAR Hall of Fame and Bechtler Museum of Modern Art open.
 Population: 731,424.
 2011 – Occupy Charlotte begins.
 2012
 Little Sugar Creek Greenway built.
 Democratic National Convention held in Charlotte.
 2013
 Robert Pittenger becomes U.S. representative for North Carolina's 9th congressional district.
 Population: 792,862.
 2014 – Alma Adams becomes U.S. representative for North Carolina's 12th congressional district.
 2015 – Population: 827,121 (estimate).
 2016 – September: Protests and unrest following the shooting of Keith Lamont Scott leave several police officers wounded, and a civilian shot.

See also
 History of Charlotte
 Mayor of Charlotte, North Carolina (list)
 List of Charlotte neighborhoods
 National Register of Historic Places listings in Mecklenburg County, North Carolina
 List of tallest buildings in Charlotte
 Timelines of other cities in North Carolina: Asheville, Durham, Fayetteville, Greensboro, Raleigh, Wilmington, Winston-Salem

References

Bibliography

Published in 19th century
 

Published in 20th century
 
 
 
 
 
  + Chronology
  (fulltext via Open Library)
 
 

Published in 21st century

External links

 
 Items related to Charlotte, various dates (via Digital Public Library of America)
 

 
Charlotte